The Archbishop of St Andrews and Edinburgh is the ordinary of the Roman Catholic Archdiocese of St Andrews and Edinburgh. The archdiocese covers an area of 5,504 km2. The metropolitan see is in the City of Edinburgh where the archbishop's seat (cathedra) is located at the Cathedral Church of Saint Mary. The eighth and current archbishop is Leo Cushley.

History 
After the Scottish Reformation, the Roman Catholic Church abandoned the hierarchy and for nearly a century Roman Catholics in Scotland were under the jurisdiction of the English prefects and vicars apostolic. In 1653, the Prefecture Apostolic of Scotland was established, which was elevated to the Vicariate Apostolic in 1694. On 23 July 1727, Scotland was divided into the Vicariates Apostolic of the Lowland District and the Highland District, each headed by a vicar apostolic. On 13 February 1827, Scotland was divided again into three vicariates apostolic; the Eastern District (formerly the Lowland District), the Northern District (formerly the Highland District), and the Western District (created from parts of the other two districts). On the restoration of the Scottish hierarchy by Pope Leo XIII on 15 March 1878, part of the Eastern District was elevated to the status of a metropolitan archdiocese with the title St Andrews and Edinburgh.

List of ordinaries

See also
Archbishop of St Andrews

References

Bibliography

 
 

Christianity in Edinburgh